Charles Schorn (1 May 1842 - 25 March 1915) was a bugler in the United States Army who was awarded the Medal of Honor for gallantry during the American Civil War. Schorn was awarded the medal on 3 May 1865 for actions performed at the Battle of Appomattox Courthouse on 8 April 1865.

Personal life 
Schorn was born in Germany on 1 May 1842 and lived in Sassafras, West Virginia. He married Mary Gloeckner and fathered three children. He died on 25 March 1915 in Sassafras and is buried in Sacred Heart Cemetery in Pomeroy, Ohio.

Military service 
Schorn enlisted in the Army as a bugler on 8 September 1861 at Mason City, West Virginia. He was mustered into Company M of the 1st West Virginia Cavalry. On 30 June 1863, he was promoted to chief bugler and transferred from Company M to the 1st's Field & Staff company. On 8 April 1865, at the Battle of Appomattox Courthouse, he captured the flag of the Confederate Sumter Flying Artillery.

Schorn's Medal of Honor citation reads:

Schorn was mustered out of the Army on 8 July 1865.

References 

United States Army Medal of Honor recipients
American Civil War recipients of the Medal of Honor
1842 births
1915 deaths
People from Mason County, West Virginia
Military personnel from West Virginia